Immalanjärvi is a medium-sized lake of Finland. It is situated between Imatra and Ruokolahti settlements in South Karelia. It belongs to the Vuoksi main catchment area. It is situated very close to the Finnish-Russian border, and the eastern part of the lake is on the Russian side.

See also
List of lakes in Finland

References

South Karelia
Lakes of Imatra